Guns in the Dark is a 1937 American Western film directed by Sam Newfield and written by Charles F. Royal. The film stars Johnny Mack Brown, Claire Rochelle, Syd Saylor, Ted Adams, Dick Curtis, and Steve Clark. The film was released on May 13, 1957, by Republic Pictures.

Plot

Cast
Johnny Mack Brown as Johnny Darrel
Claire Rochelle as Joan Williams
Syd Saylor as Oscar 
Ted Adams as Manuel Mendez
Dick Curtis as Brace Stevens
Steve Clark as Pete Small
Jim Corey as Jim Badger
Julian Madison as Dick Martin
Roger Williams as Ranger Adams

References

External links
 

1937 films
American Western (genre) films
1937 Western (genre) films
Republic Pictures films
Films directed by Sam Newfield
American black-and-white films
1930s English-language films
1930s American films